Peter Forbes Ricketts, Baron Ricketts,  (born 30 September 1952) is a retired British senior diplomat and a life peer. He has sat as a crossbencher in the House of Lords since 2016.

Ricketts served as chair of the Joint Intelligence Committee (JIC) under Prime Minister Tony Blair. He was the UK government's first national security adviser from 2010 from 2012, serving under Prime Minister David Cameron.

Personal life 
Ricketts attended Bishop Vesey's Grammar School, Sutton Coldfield, and Pembroke College, Oxford, where he read English Literature. He married Suzanne Horlington; they have two adult children.

Diplomatic career 

Ricketts began his career in the Foreign and Commonwealth Office in 1974 and served as the Assistant Private Secretary to former Foreign Secretary Geoffrey Howe. He later served as the Permanent Representative to NATO in Brussels. Apart from Brussels, he has been posted to Singapore, Washington DC and Paris.

He served under Prime Minister Tony Blair as Chairman of the Joint Intelligence Committee, leading him to give evidence to The Iraq Inquiry ("The Chilcot Report") in November 2009. From 2006 to 2010, Ricketts served under Blair and Prime Minister Gordon Brown as the Permanent Secretary for the Foreign and Commonwealth Office.

He served under Prime Minister David Cameron as the UK National Security Adviser from 2010 to 2012. He replaced Peter Westmacott as HM Ambassador to France effective January 2012, with Kim Darroch taking Ricketts's old role as National Security Adviser.

In January 2016, he stepped down as the UK Ambassador to France and retired from the Diplomatic Service.

Public life
He was nominated for a life peerage in the 2016 Prime Minister's Resignation Honours and was created Baron Ricketts, of Shortlands in the County of Kent, on 17 October. He now sits as a Crossbench peer.

Between 2016 and January 2022 he was a Strategic Adviser to Lockheed Martin UK.

In October 2020 a cross-party group of MPs and peers, backed by Lord Ricketts, planned to take legal action against Prime Minister Boris Johnson over his government's refusal to order an inquiry into Russian interference in UK elections. The move followed the publication in July 2020 of the Russia report by parliament's intelligence and security committee (ISC), which found that the government and its intelligence services had failed to investigate Kremlin meddling in the 2016 EU referendum vote. The high court claim named Prime Minister Johnson as defendant.

In April 2022, Ricketts called Marine Le Pen's proposal for a Franco-British defence cooperation treaty "ignorant and dangerous."

Honours 
He was appointed CMG in the 1999 Birthday Honours, Knight Commander of the Order of St Michael and St George (KCMG) in 2003, Knight Grand Cross of the Order of St Michael and St George (GCMG) in the 2011 New Year Honours, and Knight Grand Cross of the Royal Victorian Order (GCVO) in 2014.

See also 
 Politics of the United Kingdom

References 

1952 births
Living people
Crossbench life peers
Diplomatic peers
Life peers created by Elizabeth II
People educated at Bishop Vesey's Grammar School
Alumni of Pembroke College, Oxford
Members of HM Diplomatic Service
Private secretaries in the British Civil Service
Permanent Under-Secretaries of State for Foreign Affairs
Chairs of the Joint Intelligence Committee (United Kingdom)
Permanent Representatives of the United Kingdom to NATO
Ambassadors of the United Kingdom to France
Knights Grand Cross of the Order of St Michael and St George
Knights Grand Cross of the Royal Victorian Order
20th-century British diplomats